Bəyimli is a village and municipality in the Agsu Rayon of Azerbaijan. It has a population of 331.

References

Populated places in Agsu District